The following is list of Philippine drama series (also known as teleserye, Filipino telenovelas or P-drama) aired in the Philippine television.

By debut year

2023

2022

2021

2020

2019

2018

By channel

ABC 5/TV5 
10 Signatures to Bargain with God (2017–2018)
1896 (1996)
Ang Utol Kong Hoodlum (2011)
Ang Panday (2016)
Ate ng Ate Ko (2020–2021)
Babaeng Hampaslupa (2011)
Bakit Manipis ang Ulap? (2016)
Baker King (2015)
Balintataw (1970–1972)
Beki Boxer (2014)
Carlo J. Caparas' Bangis (2011)
Cassandra: Warrior Angel (2013)
Confessions of a Torpe (2014)
Enchanted Garden (2012–2013)
Encounter (2021)
Felina: Prinsesa ng mga Pusa (2012)
For Love or Money (2013–2014)
Gintong Pangarap (2000–2001)
Glamorosa (2011–2012)
Hourglass (2018)
Isang Dakot Na Luha (2012)
Kidlat (2013)
Madam Chairman (2013–2014)
Mga Nagbabagang Bulaklak (2011)
Mga Yagit Sa Lansangan (1992)
My Driver Sweet Lover (2010–2011)
My Fair Lady (2015)
Never Say Goodbye (2013)
Niña Niño (2021–2022)
Noli Me Tangere (1992)
Obsession (2014)
Operation: Break the Casanova's Heart (2018)
P. S. I Love You (2011–2012)
Paano ang Pangako? (2020–2021)
Positive (2013–2014)
Salamisim (1971)
Stay-In Love (2020–2021)
The Legal Mistress (2018)
The Mysterious Case of Bea Montenegro (2018)
The Sisters (2011)
Trenderas (2014)
TV5 Mini Serye (2011–2013)
Misibis Bay (2013)
Nandito Ako (2012)
Sa Ngalan ng Ina (2011)
Undercover (2013)
Valiente (produced by TAPE Inc., 2012)
Viva Telekomiks (1992)

ABS-CBN

BEAM TV 
Daddy's Angel (2019)

IBC 13 
24 Oras 
Aksyon sa Telebisyon
Alagad
All About Adam (2010)
Ang Tungkod ni Moises
Bukas May Kahapon (2019, produced by SMAC Television Production)
Dahong Ginto (1973–1975)
Dear Heart (1998–2000, produced by Vintage Television and Viva Television)
Dear Teacher
El Corazon de Oro (1989–1990)
H2K: Hati-Hating Kapatid (2000–2001, produced by Viva Television)
Habang May Buhay (2000–2002, produced by Viva Television)
Hiyas (1986–1987, produced by AstroVisions)
Ito ang Inyong Tia Dely
Kroko: Takas sa Zoo (2010)
May Bukas Pa (2000, produced by Viva Television)
Mga Himala at Gintong Aral ni El Shaddai (1994–1997)
Manila Manila
Noli Me Tangere (2013–2014)
Pangarap Kong Jackpot (1997–1998; re-aired 2007–2010, produced by PCSO (Philippine Charity Sweepstakes Office)
Pangako ng Lupa (2002, produced by Viva Television)
Regal Juvenile
Subic Bay (2000–2001, produced by Viva Television)
Ula ang Batang Gubat (1990–1991)
Familia de Honor

GMA Network

GMA News TV 
 Bayan Ko 
 Project Destination 
 Titser

GTV 
 The Lost Recipe

PTV 4 
Ang Pangarap Kong Jackpot (1995–1998; 2010, produced by PCSO (Philippine Charity Sweepstakes Office)
Balintataw (1986–1993)
Count My Blessings (2008–2009)
Dapitan 1896 (1982)
Diyos Ko, Mahal Mo Ba Sila? (2005–2007)
Dulansining (1977–1978)
Hilda (1979)
Ikaw ang Mahal Ko (1994–1995)
Kadenang Rosas (1988–1991)
Krusada Kontra Korupsyon (2007–2008)
Krusada Kontra Krimen (2005–2007)
Mga Kwentong Buhay (1986–1987)
Mukha ng Buhay (1996–1998, produced by Viva Television)
Pabrika (1986)
Tierra Sangre (1996–1998, produced by Viva Television)

QTV 
 My Guardian Abby 
 Noel 
 Posh

Radio Philippines Network 
Agila (1987–1989 produced by TAPE Inc.)
Agos (1987–1988)
Ako... Babae (1994)
Ang Makulay Na Daigdig ni Nora (1974–1979)
Ang Pangarap Kong Jackpot (1995–2007, produced by PCSO (Philippine Charity Sweepstakes Office)
Anna Luna, Ikalawang Aklat (1994–1995)
Bedtime Stories
Charo (1988)
Correctionals (1989–1990)
Dayuhan
Dear Manilyn (1988–1991)
Heredero (1984–1987 produced by TAPE Inc.)
La Aunor (1984)
Lumayo Ka Man (1993-1996)
Makulay Ang Daigdig Ni Nora (1976–1978)
Malayo Pa Ang Umaga (1993–1995)
May Bukas Pa (2000–2001, produced by Viva Television)
May Puso ang Batas (2003–2004)
Miranova (1994–1995)
Pamilya
Simply Snooky (1986–1988)
Talambuhay (1981–1985)
Tanglaw ng Buhay (1990–1994)
Teenage Diary (1986–1988)
Verdadero (1986–1988)
Young Love, Sweet Love (1987–1993)

Notes

See also
 Television in the Philippines

 Lists of television series by channel:
 ABS-CBN original drama series
 GMA Network original drama series
 TV5 original drama series

References

Telenovelas

Dynamic lists
Philippine
Drama
Lists of Philippine television series
